TrSS Londonderry was a passenger vessel built for the Midland Railway in 1904.

History

TrSS Londonderry was designed by the Messrs Bilee Gray and Co, naval architects to the Midland Railway and built by William Denny and Brothers of Dumbarton. She was launched on 29 April 1904 by Mrs Tilney, daughter of Sir Ernest Paget, Chairman of the Midland Railway. She was the first ship equipped with Lodge-Muirhead wireless telegraphy.

She was requisitioned by the Admiralty in 1914.

In 1923 she came into the ownership of the London, Midland and Scottish Railway when they acquired the Midland Railway.

In 1927 they sold her to Société Anonyme de Gérance et d'Armement who renamed her Flamand.

She was scrapped at Altenwerder, Germany in 1937.

References

1904 ships
Passenger ships of the United Kingdom
Steamships of the United Kingdom
Ships built on the River Clyde
Ships of the Midland Railway
Ships of the London, Midland and Scottish Railway